Blood Street is a 1988 action film co-directed by Leo Fong. It stars Fong in a reprised role as private detective Joe Wong who has been hired to find a woman's husband who has gone missing. Richard Norton, Stan Wertlieb, Stack Pierce, Chuck Jeffreys and Kymberly Paige also appear in the film.

Story
Joe Wong was a character that previously appeared in a Leo Fong film, Low Blow. He was a California PI who ran his business out of his shabby unkempt office. Wong returns in this film as one of the best in the business, operating from his base in San Francisco.  One day a woman walks into Wong's office and asks for his help. She needs him to find her missing husband Aldo. This takes Wong on a journey though the criminal world. Along the way he encounters a father and son team of Solomon and Bones which is played by Stack Pierce and Chuck Jeffreys. Wong ends up getting involved in a gang war between  Malcolm Boyd (played by Richard Norton) and Aldo (played by Stan Wertlieb), the man he was supposed to be looking for.

Background
Due to the recurring character Joe Wong, the film is probably a sequel of sorts to Low Blow where in this film, Fong plays a Raymond Chandler type martial arts expert.<ref>The Hollywood Reporter, Volume 317, Issues 1-18 - Page 158</ref> The alternative title Eyes of the Dragon 2 Bloodstreet, could give the impression that it is a possible sequel to another Fong Directed title Eyes of the Dragon, which also featured Richard Norton, Chuck Jeffreys.Filmstarts - Eyes of the Dragon II - Bloodstreet

It was directed by both Leo Fong and George Chung, and the cinematographer was Frank Harris.BFI - Bloodstreet (1989), Casst & Credits

The narration for the film was provided by Leo Fong.

Roles and actor info
Stack Pierce who plays Solomon here, acted in Low Blow'' and depending on which source, he played either Corky or Duke.

References

External links
 
 Assorted Thoughts From An Unsorted Mind: Film Review: Blood Street (1988)
 World Film Geek REVIEW: Blood Street (1988)

1988 films
1988 action films
American action films
American independent films
1988 independent films
American martial arts films
Films shot in California
Films directed by Leo Fong
1988 martial arts films
1980s English-language films
1980s American films